Constance of Castile may refer to:

 Constance of Castile (1141–1160), wife of Louis VII of France
 Constanza Manuel (1323–1345), wife of Alfonso XI of Castile and Peter I of Portugal
 Constance of Castile, Duchess of Lancaster (1354–1394), claimant to the throne of Castile